Tyotyo Hubert James (born 1958) is a South African politician and trade union leader who is the Chairperson of the Portfolio Committee on Public Service and Administration, Performance Monitoring & Evaluation and a Member of the National Assembly for the African National Congress (ANC). He had previously served as the first deputy president of the Congress of South African Trade Unions (COSATU).

Political career
As a trade union leader, he was involved with the National Union of Mineworkers in the Free State province. He is a former board member of the Immigration Advisory Board and a former board member of TransCaledon Tunnel Authority. James served as the first deputy president of the Congress of South African Trade Unions (COSATU) until 2018. James supported Cyril Ramaphosa's candidacy for ANC president in 2017. Ramaphosa was elected at the ANC's elective conference in December 2017 and became president of South Africa in February 2018.

James was elected to the National Assembly in the 2019 parliamentary elections as a member of the African National Congress. He was then elected as Chairperson of the Portfolio Committee on Public Service and Administration, Performance Monitoring & Evaluation.

References

External links
Profile at Parliament of South Africa

Living people
1958 births
Xhosa people
African National Congress politicians
Members of the National Assembly of South Africa